Villefranche may refer to:

Places in France
 Villefranche, Gers, Gers department
 Villefranche, Yonne, Yonne department
 Villefranche-d'Albigeois, Tarn department
 Villefranche-d'Allier, Allier department
 Villefranche-de-Conflent, Pyrénées-Orientales department
 Villefranche-de-Lauragais, Haute-Garonne department
 Villefranche-de-Lonchat, Dordogne department
 Villefranche-de-Panat, Aveyron department
 Villefranche-de-Rouergue, Aveyron department
 Villefranche-du-Périgord, Dordogne department
 Villefranche-du-Queyran, Lot-et-Garonne department
 Villefranche-le-Château, Drôme department
 Villefranche-sur-Cher, Loir-et-Cher department
 Villefranche-sur-Mer, Alpes-Maritimes department
 Villefranche-sur-Saône, Rhône department
 Villefranche, former municipality, now part of Saulmory-et-Villefranche, Meuse department

Other uses
 Jacques-Melchior Villefranche (1829–1904), French Catholic publicist
 Villefranche XIII Aveyron, semi-professional rugby league football club from Villefranche-de-Rouergue
 Villefranche – Tarare Airport (IATA: XVF), the airport of Villefranche-sur-Saône

See also 
 Villafranca (disambiguation)